Sandford is a hamlet on the Isle of Wight. Sandford is on the outskirts of Godshill (where the 2011 population was listed) in the southeast part of the island. Sandford is located on the A 3020 road and public transport is provided by bus route 2 and 3, run by Southern Vectis.

Sandford hosts several businesses, including some farms and a boarding cattery. The Sandford Primitive Methodist Chapel is in Sandford.

Sandford has an entry in the Domesday Book of 1086. There were two mills in Sandford. Sandford was the site of brickmaking operations in the past.

References

Villages on the Isle of Wight